Grič is a settlement in the Municipality of Ribnica in southern Slovenia. It lies just northwest of the town of Ribnica, on the main road to Velike Lašče, and forms a more or less continuous settlement with the neighbouring villages of Dolenji Lazi and Breg. The area is part of the traditional region of Lower Carniola and is now included in the Southeast Slovenia Statistical Region.

References

External links
Grič on Geopedia

Populated places in the Municipality of Ribnica